Pedro Almacen Barbin (born May 13, 1895, died January 29, 1984, was born in Vinzons (formerly Indan), Camarines Norte. He graduated from Colegio de Nueva Caceres, Naga, Camarines Sur with a degree of Bachelor of Arts with honors as "Sobresalente".

Before World War II, he entered politics and was elected first as Councilor and later as Mayor of Indan.

During the Japanese occupation, he was sought and requested by the Imperial Japanese Army to act again as town mayor. He acceded in order to protect the population from harassment and brutalities of the Japanese soldiers, of course, his acceptance of the position was with the blessing of the guerillas under the Vinzons Guerillas Command.

After the war, he entered public service again and was elected as member of the provincial board of Camarines Norte.

References

1895 births
Mayors of places in Camarines Norte
1984 deaths
People from Camarines Norte